Cátia Isabel da Silva Azevedo (born 9 March 1994) is a Portuguese sprinter specialising in the 400 metres. She won two gold medals at the 2018 Ibero-American Championships.

Her personal bests in the event are 50.59 seconds outdoors (Huelva 2021) and 53.10 seconds indoors (Madrid 2020). The first is the current national record.

International competitions

References

External links

 

1994 births
Living people
Portuguese female sprinters
Athletes (track and field) at the 2016 Summer Olympics
Athletes (track and field) at the 2020 Summer Olympics
Olympic athletes of Portugal
Athletes (track and field) at the 2018 Mediterranean Games
People from Oliveira de Azeméis
Athletes (track and field) at the 2019 European Games
European Games medalists in athletics
European Games bronze medalists for Portugal
Competitors at the 2017 Summer Universiade
Competitors at the 2019 Summer Universiade
Ibero-American Championships in Athletics winners
Mediterranean Games competitors for Portugal
Olympic female sprinters
Sportspeople from Aveiro District
20th-century Portuguese women
21st-century Portuguese women
Athletes (track and field) at the 2022 Mediterranean Games
Mediterranean Games gold medalists in athletics
Mediterranean Games gold medalists for Portugal
World Athletics Championships athletes for Portugal